Bucculatrix clavenae is a moth in the family Bucculatricidae. It was described by Josef Wilhelm Klimesch in 1950. It is found in the Alps.

There is probably one generation per year.

References

Natural History Museum Lepidoptera generic names catalog

External links
 Images representing Bucculatrix clavenae at Consortium for the Barcode of Life

Bucculatricidae
Moths described in 1950
Moths of Europe
Leaf miners